General elections were held in Grenada on 24 September 1957. Following the introduction of the new Constitution on 21 December 1959 real authority for governing the country was given to a Chief Minister and those from the majority party in the Legislative Council based on the 1957 elections. Herbert Blaize was appointed the first Chief Minister from 1 January 1960 when the Legislative Council provisions took effect, with the cooperation of the independents who chose to support the Grenada National Party.

Background
This was the third election in Grenada's history held on the basis of universal adult suffrage.  It was the first to have several competing political parties and for the first time Eric Gairy's Grenada United Labour Party had competition from other political parties, including the Grenada National Party led by John Watts and Herbert Blaize.

Results

References

1957 in Grenada
Elections in Grenada
Grenada
British Windward Islands
September 1957 events in North America